The 2013 Africa Cup of Nations qualification was the qualification process for the 2013 Africa Cup of Nations, the 29th edition of the Africa Cup of Nations tournament. South Africa automatically qualified as the host country.

Qualified nations

† Bold indicates champion for that year
† Italic indicates host

Format
A total of 47 countries entered the competition, including South Africa, which automatically qualified.

The remaining 46 teams competed in the qualifiers. In each of the three rounds, teams were drawn into two-legged home-and-away knock-out ties. Aggregate goals are used to determine the winner. If the sides are level on aggregate after the second leg, the away goals rule is applied, and if still level, the tie proceeds directly to a penalty shootout (no extra time is played).
Preliminary round: The lowest-ranked four teams started from the preliminary round.
First round: The two winners of the preliminary round joined the other 26 teams which did not qualify for the 2012 Africa Cup of Nations.
Second round: The 14 winners of the first round joined the 16 teams which qualified for the 2012 Africa Cup of Nations.
The 15 winners of the second round qualified for the finals.

The draw for the preliminary round and the first round was made on 28 October 2011 in Malabo, Equatorial Guinea. The draw for the second round was made on 5 July 2012 in Johannesburg, South Africa, after the first round was completed.

Below is the list of entrants:

Notes
Togo were banned from the 2012 and 2013 Africa Cup of Nations tournaments by CAF after they withdrew from the 2010 tournament following a deadly attack on their team bus. Togo appealed to the Court of Arbitration for Sport, with FIFA president Sepp Blatter stepping in to mediate. The ban was subsequently lifted with immediate effect on 14 May 2010, after a meeting of the CAF Executive Committee.
Did not enter: Comoros, Djibouti, Eritrea, Mauritania, Mauritius and Somalia. South Sudan was not able to enter as qualifying was already in progress when they became a CAF member.

Preliminary round
Originally scheduled 6–8 and 20–22 January 2012. However, the São Tomé and Príncipe v Lesotho match was postponed from 8 January to 15 January at the request of the Lesotho Football Association due to the unavailability of flights to São Tomé via Libreville.

|}

Notes
 Note 1: Swaziland withdrew due to financial reasons. Seychelles advanced to the First round against Congo DR.

São Tomé and Príncipe won 1–0 on aggregate and advanced to the First round against Sierra Leone.

First round
Scheduled 29 February and 15–17 June 2012. The Central African Republic v Egypt match was postponed from 29 February to 30 June at the request of the Egyptian Football Association due to the Port Said Stadium disaster.

|}

Notes
 Note 2: Order of legs reversed after original draw.

1–1 on aggregate. Ethiopia won on the away goals rule and advanced to the Second round.

Nigeria won 2–0 on aggregate and advanced to the Second round.

Uganda won 5–3 on aggregate and advanced to the Second round.

2–2 on aggregate. Zimbabwe won on the away goals rule and advanced to the Second round.

Algeria won 6–2 on aggregate and advanced to the Second round.

2–2 on aggregate. Togo won on the away goals rule and advanced to the Second round.

Sierra Leone won 5–4 on aggregate and advanced to the Second round.

Cameroon won 2–0 on aggregate and advanced to the Second round.

Malawi won 4–3 on aggregate and advanced to the Second round.

Congo DR won 7–0 on aggregate and advanced to the Second round.

2–2 on aggregate. Mozambique won the penalty shootout and advanced to the Second round.

Central African Republic won 4–3 on aggregate and advanced to the Second round.

Cape Verde won 7–1 on aggregate and advanced to the Second round.

Liberia won 1–0 on aggregate and advanced to the Second round.

Second round

Seeding
The 30 teams which qualified for the second round were ranked based on their performances during the last three Africa Cup of Nations, i.e. the 2008, 2010, and 2012 editions. For each of the last three African Cup of Nations final tournaments, the following system of points is adopted for the qualified countries:

Moreover, a weighted coefficient on points was given to each of the last three editions of the Africa Cup of Nations as follows:
2012 edition: points to be multiplied by 3
2010 edition: points to be multiplied by 2
2008 edition: points to be multiplied by 1

If two countries are equal in the number of points in the above classification the number of points that they have accumulated throughout all their matches played in the last 3 final tournaments of the CAN determined their ranking (on the basis of 3 points for a win, 1 point for a draw and 0 for a match lost).

The teams were divided into two pots based on the ranking. Each tie contained one team from each pot. The order of legs for each tie was determined by draw.

Matches
Scheduled 7–9 September and 12–14 October 2012.

|}

Notes
 Note 3: Libya v Algeria played in neutral venue of Morocco due to the political situation in Libya.
 Note 4: Senegal v Ivory Coast was abandoned with 15 minutes to go, after the crowd started to riot. The result was confirmed as 2–0 in favor of Ivory Coast by the CAF.

Mali won 7–1 on aggregate and qualified for the 2013 Africa Cup of Nations.

3–3 on aggregate. Angola won on the away goals rule and qualified for the 2013 Africa Cup of Nations.

Ghana won 3–0 on aggregate and qualified for the 2013 Africa Cup of Nations.

Nigeria won 8–3 on aggregate and qualified for the 2013 Africa Cup of Nations.

1–1 on aggregate.  Zambia won the penalty shootout and qualified for the 2013 Africa Cup of Nations.

Cape Verde won 3–2 on aggregate and qualified for the 2013 Africa Cup of Nations.

Morocco won 4–2 on aggregate and qualified for the 2013 Africa Cup of Nations.

2–2 on aggregate. Tunisia won on the away goals rule and qualified for the 2013 Africa Cup of Nations.

Niger won 2–1 on aggregate and qualified for the 2013 Africa Cup of Nations.

5–5 on aggregate. Ethiopia won on the away goals rule and qualified for the 2013 Africa Cup of Nations.

Algeria won 3–0 on aggregate and qualified for the 2013 Africa Cup of Nations.

Ivory Coast won 6–2 on aggregate and qualified for the 2013 Africa Cup of Nations.

Congo DR won 5–2 on aggregate and qualified for the 2013 Africa Cup of Nations.

Togo won 3–2 on aggregate and qualified for the 2013 Africa Cup of Nations.

Burkina Faso won 3–2 on aggregate and qualified for the 2013 Africa Cup of Nations.

Goalscorers
3 goals

 Islam Slimani
 Hillal Soudani
 Ryan Mendes
 Didier Drogba
 Dieumerci Mbokani
 Adane Girma
 Ikechukwu Uche
 Jair Nunes

2 goals

 Manucho
 Alain Traoré
 Djaniny
 David Manga
 Hilaire Momi
 Leger Djime
 Dioko Kaluyituka
 Déo Kanda
 Atusaye Nyondo
 Cheick Diabaté
 Modibo Maïga
 Ahmed Musa
 Victor Moses
 Teteh Bangura
 Kei Kamara
 Muhannad Tahir
 Emmanuel Adebayor
 Geoffrey Massa
 Knowledge Musona

1 goal

 Sofiane Feghouli
 Foued Kadir
 Antar Yahia
 Djalma Campos
 Mickaël Poté
 Moumouni Dagano
 Laudy Mavugo
 Valery Nahayo
 Mmusa Ohilwe
 Eric Maxim Choupo-Moting
 Achille Emaná
 Benjamin Moukandjo
 Fabrice Olinga
 Dady
 Nhuck
 Ricardo
 Fernando Varela
 Toni Varela
 Foxi Kéthévoama
 Vianney Mabidé
 David Manga
 Mahamat Labbo
 Jérémie Basilua
 Mpeko Issama
 Trésor Mputu
 Youssouf Mulumbu
 Matt Moussilou
 Fabrice N'Guessi
 Gervinho
 Max Gradel
 Salomon Kalou
 Emad Moteab
 Mohamed Salah
 Mohamed Zidan
 Judson
 Ricardinho
 Getaneh Kebede
 Saladin Said
 Seyoum Tesfaye
 Pierre-Emerick Aubameyang
 Daniel Cousin
 Momodou Ceesay
 Saihou Gassama
 Afriyie Acquah
 Anthony Annan
 Christian Atsu
 Mohamed Yattara
 James Situma
 Allan Wanga
 Sekou Oliseh
 Omega Roberts
 Dioh Williams
 Patrick Wleh
 Paulin Voavy
 John Banda
 Joseph Kamwendo
 Mahamadou N'Diaye
 Mamadou Samassa
 Mohamed Kalilou Traoré
 Clésio Baúque
 Domingues
 Miro
 Jerry Sitoe
 Nordin Amrabat
 Abdelaziz Barrada
 Youssef El-Arabi
 Houssine Kharja
 Mohamed Chikoto
 Issoufou Boubacar Garba
 Efe Ambrose
 Nosa Igiebor
 John Obi Mikel
 José
 Lasset
 Papiss Cissé
 Dame N'Doye
 Alhaji Kamara
 Alhassan Kamara
 Medo Kamara
 Sheriff Suma
 Mohamed Ahmed Bashir
 Mudathir El Tahir
 Mosaab Omer
 Mwinyi Kazimoto
 Aggrey Morris
 Razak Boukari
 Serge Gakpé
 Dové Wome
 Fateh Gharbi
 Youssef Msakni
 Andrew Mwesigwa
 Emmanuel Okwi
 Mike Sserumaga
 Godfrey Walusimbi
 Christopher Katongo
 Khama Billiat
 Archieford Gutu

1 own goal
 Mateus Galiano da Costa (playing against Zimbabwe)
 Ronan Carolino Falcão (playing against DR Congo)

References

External links
Orange CAN 2013

2013
Qualification
Qual